Needlepoint (initiated in 2010 in Oslo, Norway) is a Norwegian jazz-rock band.

Biography 
Needlepoint includes some leading Norwegian jazz musicians according to Tor Hammerø. The band started out as a trio with Bjørn Klakegg, Nikolai Hængsle and Thomas Strønen in 2010 releasing the album The Woods Are Not What They Seem (2010). David Wallumrød joined the team in 2012 and the album Outside The Screen was released the same year. Olaf Olsen known from Bigbang, replaced Thomas Strønen in 2014. The latest album Walking up That Valley was released in 2021. They operate in a soundscape somewhere between psychedelic 1970's rock and jazz-rock.

Needlepoint have played at several festivals in Norway, at different clubs, and has also been touring in China. In November 2013 they played in Paris, and appeared at 2016 Nattjazz in Bergen, Norway.

Band members

Current members 
 Bjørn Klakegg - guitar
 David Wallumrød - keyboards (2012–present)
 Nikolai Hængsle - bass
 Olaf Olsen - drums (2014–present)

Past members 
 Erlend Slettevoll - keyboards, stand-in at gigs (2021)
 Torjus Vierli - keyboards, stand-in at gigs (2020)
 Thomas Strønen - drums (2010-2012)

Discography 
2010: The Woods Are Not What They Seem (BJK Music)
2012: Outside The Screen (BJK Music)
2015: Aimless Mary (BJK Music)
2018: The Diary of Robert Reverie (BJK Music)
2021: Walking up That Valley (BJK Music)

References

External links 
 Aimless Mary at YouTube

Norwegian experimental musical groups
Musical groups established in 2010
2010 establishments in Norway
Musical groups from Oslo